Superlópez contra el robot de bolsillo (translated as Superlópez Against the Pocket Robot) is a 2003 Spanish 3D computer-animated short film directed by Enrique Gato, and based on JAN's comics, Superlópez.

Gato, fan of this comic series, wanted to make a homage at JAN work with a 3-minute computer-animated film; although he tried to make a long duration film, that wasn't possible.

The plot is about a battle on the street between the main character against a giant robot.

Production
Gato tried to design the character by himself for make a few seconds animatics, although he tried making an adaptation as a designer before. When he began writing the script, Gato tried to get a story (not very complicated) what the fans would like, so he divided the movie in six steps: prologue, Superlópez appears, enemy appears, both fight, ending and epilogue.

Reception
JAN gave Gato his permission to make the project. Despite admitting that he won't make the film by selfishness, has a strong friendship with the cartoonist. After watching the short, JAN made a positive review.

Bibliography

See also
 JAN
 Superlópez
 Comics in Spain

References

External links

2003 films
2003 3D films
2003 short films
2003 action comedy films
2003 science fiction action films
2003 computer-animated films
2000s children's comedy films
2000s children's animated films
2000s animated superhero films
2000s action comedy films
2000s science fiction comedy films
2000s superhero comedy films
2000s animated short films
2000s Spanish-language films
Spanish 3D films
Spanish animated short films
Spanish computer-animated films
Spanish children's films
Spanish action comedy films
Spanish science fiction comedy films
Spanish animated science fiction films
Animated superhero comedy films
3D animated short films
Animated short films based on comics
Films based on Spanish comics
Animated films about robots
2000s Spanish films
Spanish superhero films